Tony Johnson (born October 24, 1999) is an American  basketball player. Johnson is a freshman at the University of Central Florida.

Career
Johnson signed with SPM Shoeters Den Bosch in the Netherlands on August 5, 2013.

In September 2014, Johnson signed with Mexican club Fuerza Regia.

References

External links
Eurobasket profile
Lafayette biography

1991 births
Living people
American expatriate basketball people in the Netherlands
Basketball players from California
Dutch Basketball League players
Lafayette Leopards men's basketball players
Point guards
Heroes Den Bosch players
People from Folsom, California
American men's basketball players